Zita Molnár (born 17 March 1976) is a Hungarian table tennis player. She competed in the women's singles event at the 2000 Summer Olympics.

References

1976 births
Living people
Hungarian female table tennis players
Olympic table tennis players of Hungary
Table tennis players at the 2000 Summer Olympics
Table tennis players from Budapest